Ernest Hayes  was Dean of Brechin from 1971 until 1983.

He was educated at Durham University and ordained in 1932. He was a Curate at Pollokshields and then Priest in charge at St Barnabas, Dennistoun. He was Rector of Ballachulish from 1947 to 1950; and of Stonehaven from 1950. He was a  Canon of St Paul's Cathedral, Dundee from 1964.

Notes

Alumni of University College, Durham
Scottish Episcopalian clergy
Deans of Brechin
Possibly living people
Year of birth missing